Skellerup Glacier is a glacier flowing west north west between All-Blacks Nunataks and Wilhoite Nunataks, west of the Churchill Mountains. Named in honor of Peter Skellerup (1918–2006), who sponsored the Antarctic wing at Canterbury Museum. He was particularly keen on scientific research and donated money to build a specialist Antarctic Library at the Museum. He also donated a large collection of Antarctic materials to the Museum, including some very old and rare Antarctic manuscripts. He remained interested in the collection and continued his sponsorship and donations over more than 30 years.

References

Glaciers of Oates Land